The Arthur Barnwell House, which is also known as the Barnwell-DeCamps House, is a Queen Anne house in Greer, South Carolina that was built in the period 1880–1900. It was named to the National Register of Historic Places on 1982. As of 2013, the house was in the process of being moved and rebuilt at a new location.

History
The house was built for the first president of Pelham Manufacturing Company, Arthur Barnwell, on the banks of the Enoree River. The ruins of Pelham Mill and the Pelham mill village are on the opposite side of the river. It was believed to be built some time between 1880 and 1900.

It has been disassembled in ca 2015 and the parts are now forgotten and rotting on a location at Abner Creek Road.  The original location is now a leveled and barren lot.

Architecture
The house is a wood frame, two and one-half story Queene Anne house. Its irregular plan has bays projecting toward the southwest and northeast sides. The kitchen is a one-story ell on the northwest side. The residence has ship-lap siding. The steep, gabled roof has composition shingles over the original metal roof.

References

National Register of Historic Places in Greenville County, South Carolina
Queen Anne architecture in South Carolina
Houses completed in 1900
Houses on the National Register of Historic Places in South Carolina
Houses in Greenville County, South Carolina
Greer, South Carolina